Per Oskar Alfred Kjølaas (born 25 May 1948 in Kirkenes, Norway) was the bishop of the Diocese of Nord-Hålogaland in the Church of Norway from 2002 until 2014.

Kjølaas studied at the MF Norwegian School of Theology in Oslo, having graduated with a cand.theol. degree in 1974, but also holds a certificate in Sami Language and Culture from the University of Oslo (1984, Minor in Sami Language and Culture).

He worked as a minister in northern Norway (Sortland, Kautokeino, and Karasjok), serving both as a vicar, rector/priest, and provost. He has also worked as a secretary to the bishop (Diocesan vicar) and held various positions as an educator and translator of the Bible into Sami languages.

Kjølaas was consecrated as a bishop in 2002 and served in that capacity until his retirement in 2014.

References

External links 

1948 births
Living people
People from Sør-Varanger
Bishops of Hålogaland
21st-century Lutheran bishops
MF Norwegian School of Theology, Religion and Society alumni
University of Oslo alumni